Christopher-Massamba Mandiangu (born 8 February 1992) is a German professional footballer who plays as a forward.

Early and personal life
Mandiangu was born in Kinshasa, Zaire; his family emigrated to Mönchengladbach in Germany shortly after his birth.

Club career
Mandiangu began his career with Polizei SV before moving to the youth team of Borussia Mönchengladbach in 2002. In July 2007, he moved out of his family's home and into the Borussia Mönchengladbach boarding school.

Mandiangu spent his early senior career with Borussia Mönchengladbach II, MSV Duisburg II and TSG Neustrelitz. He moved to Berliner FC Dynamo in May 2014. He left the club by mutual consent in March 2015, and then signed for Dutch club FC Eindhoven on an amateur basis.

In December 2015, it was announced that Mandiangu would sign for Scottish club Hamilton Academical. After training with the club for three weeks, the deal completed in January 2016, with the contract running until the end of the 2015–16 season. In May 2016, it was announced that he would leave Hamilton at the end of the 2015–16 season.

In May 2016, Mandiangu signed with Slovak club MŠK Žilina on a two-year contract. He moved to Austrian club Blau-Weiß Linz in January 2017. Six-months later, Mandiangu joined Gandzasar Kapan.

On 1 September 2017 signed to Hapoel Kfar Saba.

Kokkolan PV announced on 10 December 2018, that they had signed Mandiangu for the 2019 season.

In August 2020 he signed for Albanian club Vllaznia Shkodër.

International career
Mandiangu represented Germany at under-15, and under-18 youth levels, making a total of 22 youth international appearances.

Career statistics

References

1992 births
Living people
Footballers from Kinshasa
German footballers
Association football midfielders
Germany youth international footballers
Borussia Mönchengladbach players
Borussia Mönchengladbach II players
MSV Duisburg players
TSG Neustrelitz players
Berliner FC Dynamo players
FC Eindhoven players
Hamilton Academical F.C. players
MŠK Žilina players
FC Blau-Weiß Linz players
Hapoel Kfar Saba F.C. players
Kokkolan Palloveikot players
FF Jaro players
FC Septemvri Sofia players
Widzew Łódź players
KF Vllaznia Shkodër players
Regionalliga players
Eerste Divisie players
Slovak Super Liga players
2. Liga (Slovakia) players
Liga Leumit players
Veikkausliiga players
Ykkönen players
First Professional Football League (Bulgaria) players
II liga players
German expatriate footballers
German expatriate sportspeople in the Netherlands
Expatriate footballers in the Netherlands
German expatriate sportspeople in Scotland
Expatriate footballers in Scotland
German expatriate sportspeople in Slovakia
Expatriate footballers in Slovakia
German expatriate sportspeople in Austria
Expatriate footballers in Austria
German expatriate sportspeople in Armenia
Expatriate footballers in Armenia
German expatriate sportspeople in Israel
Expatriate footballers in Israel
German expatriate sportspeople in Finland
Expatriate footballers in Finland
German expatriate sportspeople in Bulgaria
Expatriate footballers in Bulgaria
German expatriate sportspeople in Poland
Expatriate footballers in Poland
German expatriate sportspeople in Albania
Expatriate footballers in Albania
21st-century Democratic Republic of the Congo people